The following is a partial list of the "D" codes for Medical Subject Headings (MeSH), as defined by the United States National Library of Medicine (NLM).

This list continues the information at List of MeSH codes (D05). Codes following these are found at List of MeSH codes (D08). For other MeSH codes, see List of MeSH codes.

The source for this content is the set of 2006 MeSH Trees from the NLM.

– hormones, hormone substitutes, and hormone antagonists

– hormone antagonists

– aldosterone antagonists

– androgen antagonists

– antithyroid agents

– estrogen receptor modulators
  – estrogen antagonists
  – estradiol antagonists
  – selective estrogen receptor modulators

– insulin antagonists

– leukotriene antagonists

– prostaglandin antagonists

– hormones

– adrenal cortex hormones
  – 17-ketosteroids
  – androstenedione
  – androsterone
  – estrone
  – etiocholanolone
  – dehydroepiandrosterone
  – dehydroepiandrosterone sulfate
  – hydroxycorticosteroids
  – 11-hydroxycorticosteroids
  – aldosterone
  – corticosterone
  – hydrocortisone
  – 18-hydroxycorticosterone
  – tetrahydrocortisol
  – 17-hydroxycorticosteroids
  – cortisone
  – cortodoxone
  – hydrocortisone
  – tetrahydrocortisol
  – tetrahydrocortisone
  – desoxycorticosterone
  – 18-hydroxydesoxycorticosterone
  – pregnenolone
  – 17-alpha-hydroxypregnenolone

– gastrointestinal hormones
  – cholecystokinin
  – sincalide
  – epidermal growth factor
  – gastric inhibitory polypeptide
  – gastrin-releasing peptide
  – gastrins
  – pentagastrin
  – tetragastrin
  – glucagon precursors
  – enteroglucagons
  – glucagon-like peptide 1
  – motilin
  – peptide yy
  – secretin
  – vasoactive intestinal peptide

– gonadal hormones
  – activins
  – inhibin-beta subunits
  – corpus luteum hormones
  – progesterone
  – relaxin
  – gonadal steroid hormones
  – estradiol congeners
  – equilenin
  – equilin
  – estradiol
  – estriol
  – estetrol
  – estrogenic steroids, alkylated
  – ethinyl estradiol
  – ethinyl estradiol-norgestrel combination
  – mestranol
  – quinestrol
  – estrogens, catechol
  – hydroxyestrones
  – estrogens, conjugated (usp)
  – estrogens, esterified (usp)
  – estrone
  – progesterone congeners
  – pregnenolone
  – 17-alpha-hydroxypregnenolone
  – progesterone
  – 20-alpha-dihydroprogesterone
  – 5-alpha-dihydroprogesterone
  – hydroxyprogesterones
  – 17-alpha-hydroxyprogesterone
  – pregnanetriol
  – pregnanediol
  – testosterone congeners
  – androstane-3,17-diol
  – androstenediol
  – androstenedione
  – androsterone
  – dehydroepiandrosterone
  – dehydroepiandrosterone sulfate
  – dihydrotestosterone
  – etiocholanolone
  – nandrolone
  – testosterone
  – epitestosterone
  – testosterone propionate
  – inhibins
  – inhibin-beta subunits
  – testicular hormones

– gonadotropins
  – chorionic gonadotropin
  – chorionic gonadotropin, beta subunit, human
  – glycoprotein hormones, alpha subunit
  – gonadotropins, equine
  – gonadotropins, pituitary
  – follicle stimulating hormone
  – follicle stimulating hormone, beta subunit
  – glycoprotein hormones, alpha subunit
  – luteinizing hormone
  – glycoprotein hormones, alpha subunit
  – luteinizing hormone, beta subunit
  – menotropins
  – urofollitropin
  – prolactin

– hormones, ectopic

– hypothalamic hormones
  – pituitary adenylate cyclase-activating polypeptide
  – pituitary hormone release inhibiting hormones
  – msh release-inhibiting hormone
  – prolactin release-inhibiting hormone
  – somatostatin
  – pituitary hormone-releasing hormones
  – corticotropin-releasing hormone
  – gonadorelin
  – buserelin
  – goserelin
  – leuprolide
  – nafarelin
  – triptorelin
  – msh-releasing hormone
  – prolactin-releasing hormone
  – somatotropin-releasing hormone
  – sermorelin
  – thyrotropin-releasing hormone

– invertebrate hormones
  – insect hormones
  – ecdysteroids
  – ecdysone
  – ecdysterone
  – juvenile hormones
  – diflubenzuron
  – methoprene

– melatonin

– pancreatic hormones
  – glucagon precursors
  – glucagon
  – insulin
  – insulin, isophane
  – insulin, long-acting
  – proinsulin
  – c-peptide
  – pancreatic polypeptide
  – somatostatin

– peptide hormones
  – activins
  – inhibin-beta subunits
  – adiponectin
  – bombesin
  – calcitonin
  – corticotropin-releasing hormone
  – gastric inhibitory polypeptide
  – gastrins
  – glucagon precursors
  – enteroglucagons
  – glucagon-like peptide 1
  – glucagon
  – inhibins
  – inhibin-beta subunits
  – insulin
  – insulin, isophane
  – insulin, long-acting
  – proinsulin
  – c-peptide
  – leptin
  – motilin
  – msh release-inhibiting hormone
  – msh-releasing hormone
  – natriuretic peptides
  – atrial natriuretic factor
  – natriuretic peptide, brain
  – natriuretic peptide, c-type
  – pancreatic polypeptide
  – parathyroid hormone
  – teriparatide
  – parathyroid hormone-related protein
  – peptide phi
  – peptide yy
  – pituitary hormone release inhibiting hormones
  – pituitary hormone-releasing hormones
  – pituitary hormones
  – pituitary hormones, anterior
  – gonadotropins, pituitary
  – follicle stimulating hormone
  – follicle stimulating hormone, beta subunit
  – follicle stimulating hormone, human
  – glycoprotein hormones, alpha subunit
  – luteinizing hormone
  – glycoprotein hormones, alpha subunit
  – luteinizing hormone, beta subunit
  – menotropins
  – urofollitropin
  – growth hormone
  – human growth hormone
  – prolactin
  – pro-opiomelanocortin
  – corticotropin
  – alpha-msh
  – cosyntropin
  – lipotropin
  – melanocyte-stimulating hormones
  – alpha-msh
  – beta-msh
  – gamma-msh
  – thyrotropin
  – glycoprotein hormones, alpha subunit
  – thyrotropin, beta subunit
  – pituitary hormones, posterior
  – oxytocin
  – vasopressins
  – argipressin
  – deamino arginine vasopressin
  – lypressin
  – felypressin
  – ornipressin
  – vasotocin
  – placental hormones
  – chorionic gonadotropin
  – chorionic gonadotropin, beta subunit, human
  – glycoprotein hormones, alpha subunit
  – gonadotropins, equine
  – placental lactogen
  – relaxin
  – resistin
  – secretin
  – somatostatin
  – urotensins
  – vasoactive intestinal peptide
  – vasopressins
  – argipressin
  – deamino arginine vasopressin
  – lypressin
  – felypressin
  – ornipressin

– pituitary hormones
  – pituitary hormones, anterior
  – gonadotropins, pituitary
  – follicle stimulating hormone
  – follicle stimulating hormone, beta subunit
  – follicle stimulating hormone, human
  – glycoprotein hormones, alpha subunit
  – luteinizing hormone
  – glycoprotein hormones, alpha subunit
  – luteinizing hormone, beta subunit
  – menotropins
  – urofollitropin
  – prolactin
  – growth hormone
  – human growth hormone
  – pro-opiomelanocortin
  – corticotropin
  – alpha-msh
  – cosyntropin
  – lipotropin
  – melanocyte-stimulating hormones
  – alpha-msh
  – beta-msh
  – gamma-msh
  – thyrotropin
  – glycoprotein hormones, alpha subunit
  – thyrotropin, beta subunit
  – pituitary hormones, posterior
  – oxytocin
  – vasopressins
  – argipressin
  – deamino arginine vasopressin
  – lypressin
  – felypressin
  – ornipressin
  – vasotocin

– placental hormones
  – chorionic gonadotropin
  – chorionic gonadotropin, beta subunit, human
  – glycoprotein hormones, alpha subunit
  – gonadotropins, equine
  – placental lactogen

– thymus hormones
  – thymic factor, circulating
  – thymopoietins
  – thymopentin
  – thymosin

– thyroid hormones
  – dextrothyroxine
  – diiodotyrosine
  – monoiodotyrosine
  – thyroid gland, desiccated
  – thyronines
  – diiodothyronines
  – triiodothyronine
  – triiodothyronine, reverse
  – thyroxine

The list continues at List of MeSH codes (D08).

D06